Daniel Rovaro is an American Democratic Party politician who, from 2011 to 2019, served as a member of the Connecticut House of Representatives from the 51st district (comprising the towns of Putnam, Thompson, and parts of Killingly).  Rovaro, considered a fiscal conservative, often sided against his own party on budget issues.  He announced his retirement in January 2018. Rovaro formerly served as mayor of Putnam, from 1991 to 2005.

References

Democratic Party members of the Connecticut House of Representatives
People from Putnam, Connecticut
21st-century American politicians
Living people
Year of birth missing (living people)